Creighton Spencer Braun (born December 7, 2001) is an American soccer player who plays as a defender or midfielder Germania Halberstadt.

Career
Before the second half of 2020–21, Braun signed for Slovak top flight side DAC Dunajská Streda after training for Schalke in the German Bundesliga. After that, he was sent on loan to Slovak second division club ŠTK Šamorín.

References

External links
 
 

American soccer players
American expatriate soccer players
Living people
2001 births
FC DAC 1904 Dunajská Streda players
Bonner SC players
VfB Germania Halberstadt players
2. Liga (Slovakia) players
Regionalliga players
Association football midfielders
Association football defenders
American expatriate sportspeople in Slovakia
Expatriate footballers in Slovakia
American expatriate soccer players in Germany